Mole de olla is a Mexican traditional soup. It is made of xoconostle (a kind of edible cactus), squash, zucchini, green beans, corn, potato, chambarete and aguja meat, submerged into a broth of chile guajillo and chile pasilla, seasoned with garlic, onion, and epazote. It is served with pieces of chopped serrano pepper and lemon. The term mole means a mix of ingredients or sauce.

See also
 List of soups

References

Muñoz Zurita, R. (2013). Pequeño Larousse de la gastronomía mexicana. 

Mexican soups